Allium lineare is a Eurasian species of wild onions with a wide range extending from France to Mongolia.

Allium lineare has one or two bulbs each up to 15 cm across. Scape is up to 60 cm tall. Leaves are flat, shorter than the scape, very narrow, rarely more than 5 mm across. Flowers red.

formerly included
 Allium lineare var. maackii Maxim., now called Allium maackii (Maxim.) Prokh. ex Kom.
 Allium lineare var. strictum (Schrad.) Trevir., now called Allium strictum Schrad.

References

lineare
Onions
Flora of Europe
Flora of temperate Asia
Plants described in 1753
Taxa named by Carl Linnaeus